The 1983 Lada Classic was the 4th edition of the professional invitational snooker tournament, which took place from 9–16 January 1983.
The tournament was played at the Spectrum Arena, Warrington, Cheshire, and the tournament expanded from eight to sixteen professional players and ITV showed the coverage from the second day.

Steve Davis appeared in his third consecutive final and he regained the title beating Canada's Bill Werbeniuk by 9–5.

Main draw

Final

Century breaks
101  Bill Werbeniuk

References

Classic (snooker)
Classic
Classic
Classic
Sport in Warrington